Supharada "Anya" Kisskalt (born 27 February 2002) is a German taekwondo athlete.

Career History

Junior 

After winning several medals at open tournaments since 2014, Kisskalt took part in the European Junior Championships for the first time in 2015. That same year, she won a bronze medal in the -37 kg weight category at the World Junior Championships in Muju.

In 2016 and 2017, further participations in European championships followed. In 2018, she participated in the qualifying tournament for the 2018 Youth Olympic Games.

Kisskalt again competed at the European Championships in 2019 and won a bronze medal in the -49 kg weight class.

Senior 

In 2022, Kisskalt competed for the first time in the senior division at the European Championships in Manchester and at the Grand Prix in Paris. She also participated in the 2022 World Taekwondo Championships in Guadalajara, Mexico.

Later that year, Kisskalt won a silver medal at the European Under 21 Championships in Tirana.

References 

2002 births
Living people
German female taekwondo practitioners
European Taekwondo Championships medalists
21st-century German women